Abu Salem Sports Club, commonly known as Abu Salem, is a professional football club based in Abu Salem, Tripoli, Libya.

Founded in 1976, the club has traditionally worn a yellow home kit since inception.

2018–19 season is the first season for the club in the Premier League, the top tier in the Libyan football system since its inception in 1963.

References 

Football clubs in Libya
Association football clubs established in 1976
1976 establishments in Libya
Sport in Tripoli, Libya